Jeffrey Walker (born 10 July 1982) is an Australian director and former actor, best known to the Australian public for his appearances as a child actor in Ocean Girl and Round the Twist. He moved on to direct episodes of Australian soaps Neighbours, Home and Away, and H2O: Just Add Water. He is married to American-born Australian actress Brooke Harman-Walker.

Career
Walker's first acting credit was a small role in The Flying Doctors in 1989. He's also credited for starring in 1991 film Proof.  In 1992, he took over the role of Bronson Twist in the television series Round the Twist, based on the books by Paul Jennings. In 1994 he received a leading role in Ocean Girl as "Brett Bates". He had another major role as the brother Royce on Mirror, Mirror.

Walker received leading roles in The Wayne Manifesto in 1996 (for which he received a Young Actor's Award from the Australian Film Institute) and Thunderstone (1999), in which he played Wayne and Noah Daniels respectively.

Since his appearance in Thunderstone, Walker has focused his efforts on directing, working on soaps such as Neighbours and Home and Away and series such as Holly's Heroes and children's series Dance Academy, Wicked Science, H2O: Just Add Water, The Elephant Princess and Blue Water High. Walker has also directed several episodes of the American sitcom Modern Family. 

Walker also plays guitar in Sydney band Ballet Imperial.

Filmography

Actor

Director

Personal life
Walker met future wife Brooke Harmon while they worked together on The Wayne Manifesto. Together they have two sons, Boston Scott Walker (b. 24 June 2013) and Ace Jackson Walker (b. 24 June 2015).

Walker appeared in the video clip of the John Butler Trio's song titled 'Something's Gotta Give'.

References

Jeffrey Walker at h2O – Just Add Water

External links
Ballet Imperial on MySpace.com

Australian male television actors
Australian television directors
Australian male child actors
Male actors from Melbourne
1982 births
Living people